Prasophyllum pyriforme, commonly known as the graceful leek orchid is a species of orchid species endemic to eastern Australia. It has a single tubular leaf and up to fifty greenish flowers with a pink or white labellum. As with others in the genus, the labellum is above the column rather than below it.

Description
The callus in the centre of the labellum is greenish, wrinkled and extends almost to the tip of the labellum. Flowering occurs in November and December.

Taxonomy and naming
Prasophyllum pyriforme was first formally described in 1933 by Edith Coleman and the description was published in The Victorian Naturalist from a specimen collected near Doncaster. The specific epithet (pyriforme) is derived from the Latin words pyrum meaning "pear" and forme meaning "shape".

Distribution and habitat
The graceful leek orchid grows in woodland and open forest and flowers more prolifically after fire. It occurs in southern and eastern Victoria and on the south coast of New South Wales.

References

pyriforme
Flora of New South Wales
Flora of Victoria (Australia)
Endemic orchids of Australia
Plants described in 1933